Kalari or Kaladi is an Indian traditional ripened cheese product.

It is indigenous to Ramnagar in the Udhampur District of the Jammu division, within the union territory of Jammu and Kashmir, India and a cherished food snack among ethnic Dogras. It is a very dense cheese that is usually sautéd in its own fat and salted while serving. Kalaris are usually made from cow's or buffalo's milk, though kalaris made from goat's milk are also available, and have a whitish color. Traditionally Kalaris are made from raw (uncooked) full fat milk that is separated using soured milk. The solidified part is packed in donas (small bowls made of leaves) and sun dried. The excess liquid drips down from the semi-porous donas and rest of the moisture is lost by sun drying. As the ambient temperature is low and the sun is strong in the Shivalilk mountains, the Kalari becomes dry from outside yet retains moisture from inside. Some times fungus grows on this and gives it a unique flavor.

Background
Kalari, traditionally a Chenani, Ramnagar, Udhampur cheese, is an authentic Dogra cheese and often made part of various cheese-based cuisines, such as the "Kaladi Kulcha," which is a popular snack indigenous to Jammu region. To prepare a Kalari, it is dabbed in salt and sautéd in its own fat, it is covered while sautéing. Preparing Kalari requires some expertise that may be mastered in couple of trials. Some people use butter or ghee for making it more viscous and for making it properly crispy. After some time the Kalari is flipped over and covered again. After sautéing, it gets brownish crispy layer outside and soft, creamy, gooey melted cheese inside (akin to melted mozzarella cheese). That is the precise reason Kalari is often termed as "Mozzarella of Jammu" or "Mozarella of Dogras".

Kalari is often served hot and salted with tomatoes, onions, bread and cabbage. In recent improvisation it is made like a burger with Kalari as the patty in layers of coleslaw like salad, tomatoes, etc. filled up in a bun. Kalari is also served with a Kulcha with first kaladi being seasoned with red powdered chilli and then squished between kulcha while being shallow fried .The complete ensemble is shallow fried. Earlier Kalari was served on its own without any breads. Later Kalari sandwich came into existence that consisted of Kalari placed in two slices of bakery bread with complete sandwich shallow fried in the pan containing left over fat from frying the kalari. Some tamarind chutney with red chilli powder and salt are also added. Sometimes it is also prepared by first wetting it and covering it in a dry mixture of whole wheat flour (atta), red chilli powder and salt then sautéing over a nonstick pan. In Jammu people also make a curry with it called कलाड़ी दा सलूना/न्योड़ा or 𑠊𑠥𑠬𑠫𑠮 𑠛𑠬 𑠩𑠥𑠰𑠝𑠬/𑠝𑠹𑠣𑠵𑠫𑠬 in local Dogri language. Pakodas are also prepared with kalari. It is a popular delicacy of Duggar people, and is served particularly at weddings and other events.

Recently, a restaurant named 'The Kalari Factory' has begun serving 'Kalari' experiments and dishes at Udhampur. They have come up with more than 20 Kalari experiments, Kalari corn Momo's being the star player.

See also
 Paneer
 Dogra
 Gujjar
 Poonch
 Ramnagar, Udhampur
 Jammu
 Indian cuisine
 Kashmiri cuisine
 List of cheeses

References

Indian cheeses
Indian cheese dishes
Indian cuisine
Kashmiri cuisine
Cow's-milk cheeses